Karen Oliveto (born April 4, 1958) is an American bishop. She is the first openly lesbian bishop to be elected in the United Methodist Church. She was elected bishop on July 15, 2016, at the Western Jurisdictional conference. Her four-year term of service began September 1, 2016 and she currently serves as the bishop of both the UMC's Rocky Mountain and Yellowstone Conferences; she was officially installed on September 24. At the time of her election, she was the senior pastor of Glide Memorial Church in San Francisco. Oliveto is married to Robin Ridenour, who is a deaconess in the United Methodist Church's California-Nevada Conference.

Biography
Originally from Long Island, New York, she was born on April 4, 1958, and raised in West Babylon, which is on the south shore of Long Island. She grew up in the Babylon United Methodist Church (New York) and had her call to ministry at the age of 11. She preached her first sermon at 16 and began working as a student pastor when she was 18.

She has served parish and campus ministries in rural and urban settings in both New York and California. In 2004, she performed the first legal same-gender marriage held in a United Methodist Church during SF’s “Winter of Love”. She has served as the associate dean of academic affairs at Pacific School of Religion in Berkeley, where she also taught United Methodist history, doctrine, polity, and evangelism as an adjunct professor for 12 years.

She was the senior pastor of the 12,000 member Glide Memorial UMC for eight years, becoming the first woman to lead one of the UMC's 100 largest membership churches.

Education 
Oliveto is a graduate of Pacific School of Religion (M.Div., 1983) and Drew University, where she received a PhD in religion and society (2002) as well as a BA (cum laude) in psychology (1980) and a MPhil (1991). Her Ph.D. dissertation topic was: "Movements of Reform, Movements of Resistance: Homosexuality and The United Methodist Church. A Case Study".

Status as bishop

On April 28, 2017, the United Methodist Church's high court ruled 6-3 that while her lesbian status was in violation of the church's policies governed by the Book of Discipline, she could still retain her position as bishop and the church's Western Jurisdiction would handle the matter. The judicial council also ruled that it did not have jurisdiction to review her nomination, election, or assignment.

Personal life 
Married to Robin Ridenour, who is a deaconess in the United Methodist Church. They met when volunteers at a junior high church camp. They began dating in 1999 and were married in 2014.

Ordained ministry 
Pastor, Bloomville UMC, Bloomville, New York 1983-1986

Campus Minister Ecumenical House Campus Ministry, San Francisco State, 1989-1992

Pastor Bethany UMC, San Francisco 1992-2004

Associate Dean of Academic Affairs/Director of Contextual Education, Pacific School of Religion, Berkeley, CA 2004-2008

Adjunct Professor of United Methodist Studies at Pacific School of Religion, 2004-2016

Adjunct Professor, DMin program at Drew University, teaching "Prophetic Leadership in Congregation and Community" 2012

Adjunct Professor of Practical Theology, Brite Divinity School (TX), teaching "Evangelism in Methodist History and Practice", 2015

Senior pastor. Glide Memorial Church, San Francisco. 2008-2016

Resident bishop of the Mountain Sky Area  of The United Methodist Church, 2016–present

See also 

 Homosexuality and Methodism
 Gene Leggett
 Paul Abels

References

External links
 Karen Oliveto at Blogspot

Living people
Bishops of the United Methodist Church
Women Methodist bishops
People from Long Island
Drew University alumni
1958 births
LGBT Methodist bishops
Women Protestant religious leaders